Wudalianchi Dedu Airport  is an airport serving the city of Wudalianchi in Heilongjiang province of Northeast China.

It received approval from the State Council of China and the Central Military Commission on 25 December 2013. Its construction budget was 644.41 million yuan, and an additional 74 million yuan for related infrastructure outside the airport. The airport was opened on 22 November 2017, with an inaugural Loong Air flight from Harbin Taiping International Airport.

Facilities
The airport has a  runway (class 4C), capable of handling Boeing 737s and Airbus 320s, and a  terminal building. It is designed to handle 300,000 passengers and 1,500 tons of cargo annually by 2020.

Airlines and destinations

See also
List of airports in China
List of the busiest airports in China

References

Airports in Heilongjiang
Airports established in 2017
2017 establishments in China